The Revolution of Dignity also known as the Maidan Revolution or the Ukrainian Revolution, took place in Ukraine in February 2014 at the end of the Euromaidan protests, when deadly clashes between protesters and state forces in the capital Kyiv culminated in the ousting of elected President Viktor Yanukovych and a return to the 2004 Constitution. It also led to the outbreak of the Russo-Ukrainian War.

In November 2013, a wave of large-scale protests (known as Euromaidan) began in response to President Yanukovych's sudden decision not to sign a political association and free trade agreement with the European Union (EU), instead choosing closer ties to Russia. Earlier that year, the Verkhovna Rada (Ukrainian parliament) had overwhelmingly approved finalizing the agreement with the EU. Russia had put pressure on Ukraine to reject it. The scope of the protests widened, with calls for the resignation of Yanukovych and the Azarov government. Protesters opposed what they saw as widespread government corruption and abuse of power, the influence of oligarchs, police brutality, and human rights violations. Repressive anti-protest laws fuelled further anger. A large, barricaded protest camp occupied Independence Square in central Kyiv throughout the 'Maidan Uprising'.

In January and February 2014, clashes in Kyiv between protesters and Berkut special riot police resulted in the deaths of 108 protesters and 13 police officers, and the wounding of many others. The first protesters were killed in fierce clashes with police on Hrushevsky Street on 19–22 January. Following this, protesters occupied government buildings throughout the country, and the Azarov government resigned. The deadliest clashes were on 18–20 February, which saw the most severe violence in Ukraine since it regained independence. Thousands of protesters advanced towards parliament, led by activists with shields and helmets, and were fired on by police snipers. On 21 February, Yanukovych and the parliamentary opposition signed an agreement to bring about an interim unity government, constitutional reforms and early elections. Police abandoned central Kyiv that afternoon and the protesters took control. Yanukovych fled the city that evening. 

The next day, 22 February, the Ukrainian parliament voted to remove Yanukovych from office by 328 to 0 (about 73% of the parliament's 450 members). Yanukovych claimed this vote was illegal and asked Russia for help. Russia condemned the events as a "coup". Pro-Russian, counter-revolutionary protests erupted in southern and eastern Ukraine. Russia occupied and then annexed Crimea, while armed pro-Russian separatists seized government buildings and proclaimed the independent states of Donetsk and Luhansk, sparking the Donbas War.

Parliament restored the 2004 amendments to the Ukrainian constitution. An interim government, led by Arseniy Yatsenyuk, signed the EU association agreement and disbanded the Berkut. Petro Poroshenko became president after winning the 2014 presidential elections. The new government began a removal of civil servants associated with the overthrown regime. There was also widespread decommunization (or de-Sovietization) of the country.

Prelude

Successive Ukrainian governments in the 2000s sought a closer relationship with the European Union (EU). The government of President Viktor Yanukovych had been negotiating an association agreement with the European Union since 2012. Such a comprehensive trade agreement with the EU would have impacted Ukraine's trade agreements with Russia, the latter being Ukraine's biggest trade partner at the time. Yanukovych believed that the complications could be addressed, and he said that he intended to enter the agreement, but continued to postpone. This was interpreted as an attempt to back out of signing this agreement, and led to a wave of protests which came to be known as the "Euromaidan" movement.

Protests originally erupted in November 2013 after Yanukovych refused to sign the association agreement with the EU at a meeting of the Eastern Partnership in Vilnius, Lithuania, choosing closer ties with Russia instead. Prime Minister Mykola Azarov had asked for €20 billion (US$27 billion) in loans and aid. The EU was willing to offer €610 million ($838 million) in loans, but Russia was willing to offer $15 billion, as well as cheaper gas prices. In addition, the EU demanded major changes to Ukraine's regulations and laws, but Russia did not stipulate regulatory or legal adjustment of such nature or scale. Russia also applied economic pressure on Ukraine and launched a propaganda campaign against the EU deal.

Yanukovych was widely disliked in Ukraine's west but had some support in the east, where his native Russian is much more spoken, and in the south. The rallies were initially peaceful but became violent in January 2014 after parliament, dominated by Yanukovych's supporters, passed laws intended to repress the protests. The European Union and the United States urged Yanukovych to negotiate a peaceful end to the conflict and said they would impose sanctions on government officials if they were found responsible for violence.

In mid-February, an amnesty agreement was made with protesters whereby they would be spared criminal charges in exchange for leaving occupied buildings. The demonstrators vacated all occupied Regional State Administration buildings, and activists in Kyiv left the Hrushevskoho Street standoff; Kyiv's City Hall was also released back to government control on 16 February. All those previously jailed for taking part in protests were scheduled to be released after 17 February.

On 14 February, Yanukovych had said: "I want to say that I was incited, and I'm incited to use various methods and ways how to settle the situation, but I want to say I don't want to be at war. I don't want any decisions made using such a radical way." He called on all politicians to refrain from radicalism and to understand that "there is a line that shouldn't be crossed, and this line is law".

Overview

The protests that began on the night of 21 November 2013 with public protests in Maidan Nezalezhnosti (Independence Square) in Kyiv were still ongoing by mid-February 2014. The protests were sparked by the Ukrainian government's decision to suspend the signing of an association agreement with the European Union (EU).

A period of relative calm in the anti-government demonstrations in Kyiv ended abruptly on 18 February 2014, when protesters and police clashed. At least 82 people were killed over the next few days, including 13 policemen; more than 1,100 people were injured.

On 18 February, some 20,000 Euromaidan protesters advanced on the Verkhovna Rada (Ukrainian parliament) in support of restoring the Constitution of Ukraine to its 2004 form, which had been repealed by the Constitutional Court of Ukraine shortly after Yanukovych was elected president in 2010. The police blocked their path. The confrontation turned violent; the BBC, citing correspondents, reported that each side blamed the other. The police fired guns (including automatic weapons and sniper rifles) with both rubber bullets and, later, live ammunition, while also using tear gas and flash grenades in an attempt to repel thousands of demonstrators. The protesters fought with crude weapons (such as large rocks and bats), firearms, and improvised explosives, especially Molotov cocktails, and broke into the headquarters of the Party of Regions. Police officers stormed the main protest camp on Maidan Nezalezhnosti and overran parts of the square. The Trade Unions Building, which served as the Euromaidan headquarters, was burned down. Political commentators suggested that Ukraine was on the brink of a civil war. Some areas, including Lviv Oblast, declared themselves politically independent of the central government.

Starting on 18 February Euromaidan activists occupied regional state administration (RSA) buildings in several oblasts (regions).

On 19 February, the authorities instituted police checkpoints, restrictions on public transportation, and school closures in Kyiv, which the media referred to as a de facto state of emergency.

On 20 February, Internal Affairs Minister Vitaliy Zakharchenko announced that he had signed a decree authorising the use of live ammunition against protesters. Central Kyiv saw the worst violence yet, and the death toll in 48 hours of clashes rose to at least 77. In response, the chairman of the Ukrainian parliament (equivalent to the office of speaker in other countries' parliaments), Volodymyr Rybak, announced the next day that he had signed a parliamentary decree condemning the use of force and urging all institutions (the Ministry of Internal Affairs, the Cabinet of Ministers, etc.) to cease immediately all military actions against protesters. Parliament also suspended Zakharchenko from his duties.

On 21 February, President Yanukovych signed a compromise deal with opposition leaders. It promised constitutional changes to restore certain powers to parliament and called for early elections to be held by December.

Despite the agreement, thousands continued to protest in central Kyiv, and the demonstrators took full control of the city's government district: the parliament building, the president's administration quarters, the cabinet, and the Interior Ministry. On 21 February, a bill to remove Yanukovych was introduced in parliament. On the same day, Yanukovych left for Kharkiv.

On 22 February, the protesters were reported to be in control of Kyiv. The parliament voted 328–0 in favour of removing Yanukovych from office and scheduled new presidential elections for 25 May.

Parliament named its chairman, Oleksandr Turchynov, as interim president on 23 February. A warrant for the arrest of Yanukovych was issued by the new government on 24 February. Over the next few days, Russian nationalist politicians and activists organised rallies in Crimea and urged the Russian government to help defend the region from advancing "fascists" from the rest of Ukraine.

Detailed timeline

18 February 2014
On 18 February at 16:00, the Kyiv Metro stopped all service because of a terrorist threat.

Initial clashes (Mariinskyi and Lypky)

The night before the clashes, Right Sector called on all of its members to ready themselves for a "peace offensive" on 18 February. The Maidan People's Union also urged all concerned citizens to take part in the "peace offensive", which student unions had agreed to join as well. The Maidan Union reported on the morning of 18 February that columns of protesters would begin a march on parliament at 08:30.

That morning, around 20,000 demonstrators marched on the parliament building as that body was set to consider opposition demands for a new constitution and government. Around 09:45, the demonstrators broke through the police barricade of several personnel-transport trucks near the building of the Central Officers' Club of Ukraine and pushed the cordon of police aside. The clashes started after some two dozen demonstrators moved a police vehicle blocking their path to parliament. At 10:00, a member of parliament representing Batkivshchyna, Lesya Orobets, reported that police armed with Fort-500T shotguns had begun to attack with flash and stun grenades from Shovkovychna Street and Lypska Street.

As the column neared the parliament building at 10:08, it met resistance from another cordon of police officers. There were reports that the number of protesters had swelled to 50,000. At 10:18, according to other reports, explosions and smoke were seen on Instytutska Street as people started to tear up roadway paving blocks. Protesters started to throw the pavement blocks at the police, while officers defending themselves with shields tried to subdue the crowd with stun grenades. Protesters who had barricaded themselves near the Dynamo Stadium colonnade began setting fire to tires. At about 10:30, parliament was set to vote on whether to restore the 2004 constitution. However, it did not happen as Chairman Rybak did not register the bill. 

At 10:33, the street fights between protesters and the police shifted to Shovkovychna Street. Protesters started to wave ₴200 banknotes in the face of some of Yanukovych's police forces—saying that they were mercenaries—in Mariinskyi Park. An activist, Oleksandr Aronets, reported that snipers were targeting civilians. By 11:00, protesters had sustained serious wounds. Molotov cocktails were thrown by the protesters, and on Shovkovnycha Street, a barricade of dump trucks was set on fire.

Raid on Party of Regions office and police retaliation
At 11:23, the Berkut special police forces tried to launch an assault on the crowd, but the protesters attacked back. Two minutes later, the first report came that protesters were breaking down the doors of the Party of Regions headquarters on Lypska Street. At 11:30, protesters—including the journalist Tetyana Chornovol—sacked and set fire to the building. Two persons died as a result, including a programmer who worked at the headquarters. At 12:12, Minister of Healthcare Raisa Bohatyriova was attacked by protesters as she left Mariinskyi Park, but she escaped unharmed. By 12:30, the police had regained control of the Party of Regions office.

By 13:00, thousands of police officers had encircled the government district and begun chasing down protesters. One protester with a head wound told the Kyiv Post that charging police officers had "smashed everybody" in their path.

Around 13:30, four officers on Instytutska Street were stationed atop a building, lobbing stun grenades at the crowd and shooting, when protesters stormed the building and set part of it on fire. The protesters forced their way to the roof, forcing the police to retreat. The building on Instytutska Street was described as the scene of the day's most violent clashes. Berkut and Internal Troops servicemen opened a full-scale assault, firing directly into the crowd. There were reports of police using water cannons to break through.

By mid-afternoon, police officers using tear gas drove as many as 10,000 protesters from Mariinskyi Park, where barricades had been built earlier in the day. Demonstrators threw stun grenades, filling the park with smoke. Other anti-government activists tried to keep the pro-government and anti-government forces apart.

Multiple news outlets published photographs showing the police armed with AK-74 assault rifles. Former Deputy Minister of Internal Affairs Hennadiy Moskal speculated that they were Alpha Group units. A Berkut leader, Vladimir Krashevsky, said the armed police officers in black with yellow armbands were part of a Berkut unit that had been deployed to help evacuate the interior troops.

Protesters re-occupied City Hall. And according to the Russian state-owned newspaper Izvestia, opposition activists armed with bats and iron rods beat a computer engineer, Valery Konstantinovich Zakharov, to death in the raid on the Party of Regions office.

Advance toward Maidan

At 15:45, hundreds of riot police officers advanced toward parliament, attacking protesters. An officer grabbed the gas mask of a Kyiv Post journalist on Instytutska Street and said of the police advance: "I love it! We love it!"
At 16:00, the acting chief of the Security Service of Ukraine, Oleksandr Yakymenko, and acting Interior Minister Zakharchenko issued a public warning to protesters to clear the streets within two hours, saying, "If by 18:00 the lawlessness doesn't cease, we shall be forced to use all legal means to bring order." At the October Palace, visible from Independence Square, riot police threw bricks down the hill at protesters from a bridge along Instytutska Street.

Breach of Hrushevskoho Street Barricade
Throughout the day of 18 February 2014, protesters lit tires, threw and launched Molotov cocktails, bars of steel and other projectiles at lines of Berkut police. At 17:04, armed Berkut untied the wire at the Mykhaila Hrushevskoho Street barricade gate near Dynamo Stadium and penetrated with some surprise. EuroMaidan protesters were watching a drone hovering from the opposite direction, with their backs turned to the police. Hundreds of Berkut began throwing grenades, two of which injured U.S. photographer Mark Estabrook and countless others while discharging their pistols and shotguns. Euromaidan protesters and civilians began a mass retreat toward the next gate in a barricade on Khreschatyk Street. There were many injuries and several deaths.

At 20:00, Pro-Russian sources had reported that 50 unknown or presumably Pro-Russian assailants were trying to break into the Canadian embassy. On the same day, a Global Affairs Canada spokesperson acknowledged that protesters had taken "shelter" and were "peaceful and have not caused any damage or harm to staff." In 2015, it was revealed that the embassy had deliberately opened its gates after spotting a Canadian passport-wielding EuroMaidan protester being chased by Berkut. Upon entry of the unknown passport-wielding EuroMaidan protester, a deluge of EuroMaidan protesters stormed the embassy and occupied the main lobby, using the embassy as a safe haven from Berkut. The embassy was used to treat the wounded during the evening of 18 February. EuroMaidan protesters later left the embassy voluntarily, leaving flowers. Unnamed European allies later asserted, that given the prolonged occupation and lack of resistance by Canadian foreign service officers, Canada played an intentional and deliberate role in enabling EuroMaidan protesters. Contemporary media sources argue that Prime Minister Stephen Harper never acknowledged the true extent of the security breach.

Attack on Maidan
Following the warning, the police advanced on thousands of protesters on Maidan Nezalezhnosti (Independence Square) with guns, a water cannon, and an armored personnel carrier. Tents housing protesters were burning on the main square. The police justified their actions as part of an anti-terror campaign against "individuals who had clearly armed themselves". Opposition leader Arseniy Yatsenyuk called on the police to retreat 200 meters up Instytutska Street and urged both sides to call a truce until morning. Protesters on the square stacked tires and other burning debris to create a wall of fire between themselves and security forces.

The TV channel 5 Kanal's broadcast was shut down countrywide but remained available via satellite (with a brief interruption) and a live feed on YouTube. It resumed service some hours later.

At approximately 22:00, it was reported that the police had broken through the protesters' barricades on the eastern side of the square. Officers then tried to retake the occupied Trade Unions building but failed.

Presidential adviser Hanna Herman said that negotiations between the government and the opposition would only happen once peace was restored and the crowds retreated, and that "calling further for armed conflict is a great crime against the Ukrainian people and the Ukrainian state." General Prosecutor of Ukraine Viktor Pshonka said: "Organisers of mass protests will be held accountable. We will demand the heaviest punishment both for those who revved people up to take part in today's action and for those who organised and controlled them."

At 01:35 the next morning, street lights were switched off around the square. The activists believed that this heralded the beginning of a decisive assault.

Opposition leaders meeting with President Yanukovych
Emerging from a meeting with President Yanukovych, opposition leader Vitali Klitschko told Hromadske TV that the talks had not been successful. Klitschko said that opposition leaders had listened for more than an hour to Yanukovych's claims that they were to blame for the 20 deaths on 18 February. The president also demanded that the opposition force the protesters to leave Maidan Nezalezhnosti. He reportedly threatened opposition leaders with criminal prosecution.

In a message on Ukrainian television, Yanukovych told the opposition leaders, "Separate yourself from the radical elements that seek bloodshed and conflict with law enforcement agencies," and said that if they did not do so, he would "talk differently" with them. He added: "The opposition leaders have ignored the basic foundation of democracy. The line had been crossed when they called people to arms."

On 20 February, three opposition parties (Batkivshchyna, UDAR, and Svoboda) said in a statement: "We never have and never will call people to arms. This is our principled position. The death of each person is a personal tragedy for each of us." Later that day, the parties said, "To hold talks with the regime, the policies of which led to the deaths of many people, is an extremely unpleasant thing, but we must do everything possible and even the impossible to prevent further bloodshed." They said that dissolving the protests would be "counterproductive and unrealistic" and stated: "It was not we who brought Maidan together, and it is not for us to disperse it! People will decide themselves what to do depending on when and how their demands are satisfied."

19 February

The Kyiv Metro was closed and main roads blocked by police. Bigger stores and malls on Khreshchatyk were also closed, but according to a Euronews correspondent, "Life away from the barricades is business as usual."

In the early morning, titushky shot two protesters, killing one. By this point, the death toll had risen to 26 on both sides, including 10 police.

The Security Service of Ukraine (SBU) launched an "anti-terrorist" operation, while the intelligence services began investigating unnamed politicians over what was described as an illegal attempt to seize power. The decision to begin the anti-terrorist operation involved the SBU, the Interior Ministry, the Ministry of Defence, the State Border Guard Service of Ukraine, and the central and local governments, according to a statement on the SBU website. According to political analyst Taras Berezovets, the decree meant that the SBU could search protesters, seize their property, and detain them at will, "without a court order or other legal safeguards."

In the early morning, Olena Lukash announced that the opposition had refused to sign a declaration disapproving of radical measures. President Yanukovych demanded that the opposition stop occupying buildings and seizing arms; the opposition, however, would not concede. The acting minister of defence, Pavlo Lebedyev, acknowledged that he had sent some airborne troops from Dnipropetrovsk to Kyiv. Ciphered telegrams were discovered in which Yuriy Ilyin, the newly appointed chief of the general staff of the Ukrainian Armed Forces, gave direct orders to deploy military units.

Also on 19 February, a military An-26 made a secret flight from Kyiv to Russia to pick up a large batch of anti-riot weapons and ammunition; this only became known in 2015.

A Euronews correspondent on Independence Square reported that protesters were arriving "from all parts of Ukraine". By 14:50, about 5,000 remained on the square. Right Sector occupied the Kyiv Central Post Office and the State Committee for Television and Radio, with the post office serving as a new headquarters.

President Yanukovych fired the chief of the general staff of the Ukrainian Armed Forces, Volodymyr Zamana, and replaced him with Ilyin, who was previously the commander of the Ukrainian Navy. The Ministry of Defence announced that it was redeploying units around the country to guard military facilities. The director of the SBU, Oleksandr Yakymenko, said that military bases and arms depots had been attacked in several regions.

The European Investment Bank froze activities in Ukraine, saying, "For the time being, the situation is so cruel that it would be politically the wrong signal, but also irresponsible vis-a-vis the people we asked to do the job, to be active on business in Ukraine."

Following a meeting between government and opposition leaders late at night, both sides declared a truce and agreed to start negotiations. President Yanukovych said in a statement that he had agreed to "start negotiations with the aim of ending bloodshed and stabilising the situation in the state in the interests of social peace". According to opposition politician Yatsenyuk, the truce included a pledge from Yanukovych not to launch a police assault that night. Right Sector did not agree to the truce. A Euronews correspondent on Independence Square reported that the number of protesters had grown, saying, "In general, all I have heard from people is the more they are attacked and the worse they are beaten, the more determined they are to stand back up and resume the struggle."

20 February

At 00:35, Interfax reported that Yanukovych had declared 20 February a day of mourning for those killed in the clashes.

Around 03:50, activists claimed that they had torn a shoulder patch from the uniform of a Russian Ministry of Internal Affairs (MVD) soldier during the clashes, brandishing the patch as alleged proof of Russian involvement. Protesters at Independence Square continued to hear gunshots, despite the ceasefire agreement. Around 04:20, five buses carrying protesters from Ivano-Frankivsk arrived.

Each side blamed the other for igniting the deadly conflict. Yakymenko blamed Ukraine's current Euromaidan government, claiming they were responsible for hiring snipers on 20 February. In a statement, the Presidential Administration of Ukraine claimed that the protesters had gone on the offensive: "They are working in organised groups. They are using firearms, including sniper rifles. They are shooting to kill," it said. Protesters accused the police of starting the conflict by throwing Molotov cocktails and improvised explosive devices. Opposition politician Klitschko issued a statement saying: "Armed thugs have been let loose in the streets to attack people and create an illusion that there is a confrontation between citizens."

At 09:25, protesters pushed the Berkut back to the October Palace after security forces tried to set fire to Kyiv Conservatory, which was being used as a field hospital for wounded protesters. At 09:32, it was announced that parliament would not convene. Euromaidan protesters marched on the police with shields and Molotov cocktails and forced them to retreat, thus regaining control of Independence Square and capturing up to 67 police officers. Around 10:49, law enforcement personnel were captured while sleeping in the Ukrainian House and during clashes on barricades near the October Palace. Many of the men were only 18 or 19 years old, were not trained, and were armed only with rubber truncheons. Those with minor injuries were treated by medics. The captured police were from Crimea, the central-eastern cities Dnipropetrovsk and Kryvyi Rih, and eastern Luhansk. Interior Troops soldiers, of whom almost 100 surrendered during the clashes (mostly conscripts aged 19–20), were held prisoner at the headquarters of the Energy Company of Ukraine and at the October Palace.

At 10:00, between 10,000 and 20,000 demonstrators remained, according to the Kyiv Post, and at least 42 people had been killed, primarily by police gunfire. According to a UNIAN correspondent, there were more than 30,000 people on Independence Square. At 10:55, the chief of the presidential administration, Andriy Klyuev, announced that the president was prepared to sign a treaty with the opposition on the demanded changes to the Constitution of Ukraine, and that the ongoing clashes should compel politicians to find a quick consensus.

At 10:00, Euromaidan's activists picketed the main office at the Kyiv Metro station Politekhnichnyi Instytut, demanding that the system be reopened. A former head of the Kyiv City State Administration, Ivan Saliy, also called for the reopening of the metro. At 16:00 that day, the Titushky were transported by metro from the Pozniaky station to the Pecherska station, Lvivska Gazeta reported. The government also closed highways and railway access.

Trains between Kyiv and Lviv, one of the protesters' strongholds, were temporarily suspended; a railway spokeswoman said this was because of damage to the lines. Coincidentally, there were reports that arms had been seized from an Interior Ministry armory in Lviv and transported to the outskirts of Kyiv.

The head of the Kyiv City State Administration, Volodymyr Makeyenko, resigned from the Party of Regions but said that he would continue to perform his duties to ensure that the city functioned properly. He then ordered the reopening of the Kyiv Metro. By 15:00, the metro was still not running, and ground-based transport in the city was scarce. The metro was partly reopened in the early evening, but interchange stations remained closed.

The Embassy of the United Kingdom in Kyiv was temporarily closed.

Radio Liberty published video footage of police special forces shooting protesters with Kalashnikov and sniper rifles. Acting Interior Minister Zakharchenko announced that combat weapons had been provided to the police, saying in an address to the nation, "We signed relevant orders as part of the Antiterrorist Center's work: the law enforcement officials have been provided with combat weapons, and they will be used in line with the law on police." The ministry's website said the riot police had the right to use their weapons to free hostages being held by protesters. The ministry further stated that a sniper had injured 20 of its police officers.

Interfax-Ukraine reported that at 15:00, "a group of unknown individuals" headed to the Presidential Administration Building, and shots and explosions were heard. The Euromaidan self-defense force had repeatedly urged protesters not to go outside the square's perimeter.

Diplomatic efforts
The above-mentioned clashes erupted shortly before three visiting EU foreign ministers—Radosław Sikorski of Poland, Laurent Fabius of France, and Frank-Walter Steinmeier of Germany—were due to meet with President Yanukovych to push for a compromise with the Ukrainian opposition. The meeting was delayed for security reasons and began an hour late. Before the meeting, Fabius said in an interview with BFM TV: "Our purpose is to cause the Ukrainian administration to conduct elections. There is no solution other than elections." The negotiations lasted six hours. Prime Minister Donald Tusk of Poland told reporters soon afterward, "It was agreed with Yanukovych that there was a willingness to hold early elections this year, both presidential and parliamentary." Tusk also said that Yanukovych "was willing to form a national unity government in the next 10 days and to change the constitution before the summer". Further talks were scheduled to negotiate the signing of the relevant document.

After a telephone conversation between Yanukovych and the Russian president, Vladimir Putin, Russian human rights ombudsman Vladimir Lukin was sent as an envoy to Ukraine, at Yanukovych's request, to try to mediate talks between the government and the opposition.

The United States imposed visa bans on 20 Ukrainian officials it considered "responsible for ordering human rights abuses related to political oppression". The European Union introduced a visa ban and a financial asset freeze against those responsible for the violence in Ukraine, and a ban on export to Ukraine of equipment that could be used for repression. "The scale of implementation will be taken forward in the light of developments in Ukraine," the EU Council concluded.

Ukrainian political developments
The leader of the ruling Party of Regions, Oleksandr Yefremov, travelled to Luhansk to meet with local leaders and law enforcement agents to discuss the possibility of southeastern Ukraine's declaring independence and seceding from the state. The chairman of the Supreme Council of Crimea, Vladimir Konstantinov, travelled to Moscow, where he announced that the Autonomous Republic of Crimea would secede from Ukraine if there were a change of power.

Party of Regions MP Sergiy Tigipko called for the resignation of parliament chairman Volodymyr Rybak, his replacement with an opposition parliamentarian, and the urgent election of a prime minister supported by all factions. "The president, the parliament speaker, the acting prime minister, and opposition leaders have completely lost control of the situation in the country and do not offer any solutions to pacify the country," he said. "Their inaction is leading to increased confrontation and deaths. Immediate concrete steps, rather than negotiations, are needed to resolve the crisis in the country." In the evening, Tigipko held talks with opposition politicians Yatsenyuk and Klitschko.

The head of the Kyiv City State Administration, Volodymyr Makeyenko, and 17 MPs resigned from the Party of Regions. In Rivne and Zhytomyr, the Party of Regions formally disbanded, with all MPs from those regions leaving the party as well.

Ten Party of Regions and two independent MPs called for a return to the parliamentary-presidential form of government. They also called on security forces to "execute the oath they swore to the Ukrainian people, not to follow criminal orders to use firearms, not to allow the participation of law enforcers in provocations involving gangs against the peaceful public and protesters all over Ukraine".

At 16:42, parliament convened for an emergency sitting. The Party of Regions did not take part. According to a UNIAN correspondent, 227 MPs out of 450—mostly from the opposition, but some from the Party of Regions—were present. Out of 238 deputies present, 236 voted to condemn the recent violence, ban the use of weapons against protesters, and withdraw troops and the police deployed against them. The entire parliamentary faction of the Communist Party of Ukraine and some 80% of the Party of Regions chose to miss the session. Lawmakers barred chiefs and commanders of the Interior Troops, the Armed Forces of Ukraine, the SBU, and other government agencies from carrying out any counter-terrorism operations because they violated the Constitution of Ukraine. They were also ordered to stop blocking roads and bridges, squares and streets in Kyiv and other cities and towns. The Party of Regions MPs at the sitting agreed to form an "anti-crisis group".

Late in the evening, it was announced that five more MPs had left the parliamentary faction of the Party of Regions.

The Parliament of Crimea called for an extraordinary session on 21 February. The leader of the Mejlis of the Crimean Tatar People said he suspected that lawmakers would ask for Russian military intervention, stating, "Tomorrow may be a decision that will bring chaos and disaster to Crimea." Several scholars discussed the possibility of Russian intervention in Crimea specifically, because of its unique geopolitical nature and demographics.

21 February

The Armed Forces' deputy chief of staff, Lieutenant-General Yuri Dumansky, resigned because he disagreed with the involvement of the army in the conflict. "Today the army is being involved in the civil conflict, which could lead to the mass deaths of civilians and soldiers," he said. At around midnight, journalist Artem Shevchenko, referring to his sources in the General Staff of the Armed Forces of Ukraine, announced that 10 BTRs had departed from Kozachia (Cossack) Bay, where the Black Sea Fleet of Russia is based, escorted by DAI (Road Auto Inspection) vehicles. According to Shevchenko, 1,500 airborne soldiers and 400 marines—including the 25th Airborne Brigade, the 1st Marine Brigade, the 831st Anti-sabotage Unit, and the 2nd Marine Spetsnaz—had been transferred on 20 February under the command of the SBU for the anti-terrorist operation.

In the lead-up to the day's parliamentary session, it was reported that many members of the Party of Regions and their families had fled the capital, including acting Interior Minister Zakharchenko and Prosecutor General Viktor Pshonka.

Later, Maidan activists released the Interior Troops servicemen whom they had captured the previous day. Meanwhile, the entire police force of Radekhiv joined the protesters in Kyiv.

The Security Service of Ukraine officially ended its "preparations for antiterrorist operation" introduced on 19 February.

Agreement on settlement of political crisis

A compromise deal was agreed to on 21 February after hours of negotiations led by the European Union mediators and Foreign Ministers Radosław Sikorski of Poland, Laurent Fabius of France, and Frank-Walter Steinmeier of Germany. Officially called the Agreement on settlement of political crisis in Ukraine, but unofficially called the 21 February Agreement, it was signed by both opposition leaders and the president after overnight negotiations (read the full text of the agreement here). The agreed-to provisions included a restoration of the constitution as it was between 2004 and 2010; constitutional reform to be completed by September; early presidential elections no later than December 2014; an investigation into the violence conducted under joint monitoring of the administration, the opposition, and the Council of Europe; a veto on imposing a state of emergency; amnesty for protesters arrested since 17 February; the surrender of public buildings occupied by protesters; the forfeiture of illegal weapons; "new electoral laws", and the formation of a new Central Election Commission. The three EU foreign ministers signed the document as witnesses, but not the Russian mediator Vladimir Lukin, because he had no mandate to sign an agreement on the crisis.

The 450-seat parliament voted unanimously, 386–0, to return to the 2004 constitution, and then it voted 332–0 to suspend acting Interior Minister Zakharchenko. Another bill made changes to the Criminal Code, allowing for the release of Yulia Tymoshenko. 310 MPs voted in favour of the measure, including 54 from the Party of Regions and 32 Communists. Mykola Rudkovsky introduced a bill to impeach President Yanukovych. Parliament also adopted a resolution late that evening that ordered all Interior Ministry troops and police officers to return to their barracks.

Agreement aftermath

Right Sector leader Dmytro Yarosh rejected the agreement, saying, "We have to state the obvious fact that the criminal regime had not yet realised either the gravity of its evil doing." He noted that the agreement did not include provisions for the arrest of Interior Minister Zakharchenko; the punishing of Berkut commanders alleged to have been involved in the murder of civilians; the removal of the general prosecutor and defence minister; a ban on the Party of Regions and Communist Party; and guarantees of safety for those involved in the opposition. He called for the "people's revolution" to continue until power had been completely removed from the governing authorities. Euromaidan leader Andriy Parubiy insisted that elections be held as soon as possible and reiterated that one of the main demands of protesters had been the resignation of President Yanukovych. AutoMaidan also announced that it would not accept anything short of Yanukovych's resignation.

Vitali Klitschko apologised to the crowd on Independence Square after shaking hands with Yanukovych. Protesters there responded to the deal by booing opposition leaders. Activist Volodymyr Parasiuk warned from the stage that if Yanukovych did not resign by 10:00 the next day, an armed insurrection would be staged. Outside of Kyiv, it was later discovered that the summer home of pro-Russian politician Viktor Medvedchuk had been set on fire.

By late afternoon, hundreds of riot police officers guarding the presidential compound and nearby government buildings had vanished. Radosław Sikorski, the Polish foreign minister, described the withdrawal of forces as "astonishing", noting that it was not part of the agreement. The riot police had begun withdrawing early in the morning because they feared that Yanukovych's government would pin the responsibility for the violence on them, and because they feared being attacked after protesters stole around 1,200 pistols and Kalashnikov rifles from the police on 18 February during the occupation of government buildings in Lviv. The Ukrainian Interior Ministry was left without leadership. Deputy Interior Minister Viktor Dubovik ordered the riot police to leave the city, but it is unclear where this order originated. Opposition member Serhiy Pashynsky arranged escorts out of the city for more than 5,000 officers, Interior Ministry forces, and other special forces. After the riot police vanished, Andriy Parubiy reported that Euromaidan self-defence had peacefully gained control over Kyiv and its government buildings, and that the military was standing with the opposition.

A new parliamentary coalition was created after 28 MPs left the Party of Regions' faction. Within the remaining faction, a "group of 31 deputies with a special position" was formed by Sergiy Tigipko "to persuade other Party of Regions MPs to vote progressively".

Removal of Yanukovych

On 21 February, President Yanukovych and parliament declared 22 and 23 February to be days of mourning "due to the loss of human life as a result of mass disturbances".

On 22 February, Yanukovych could not be found, and parliament were not informed of his whereabouts. There were unconfirmed media reports that he had flown to Kharkiv (the governor of Kharkiv Oblast at the time, Mykhailo Dobkin, later said Yanukovych was in Kharkiv that day). It was announced that most of the ministers had disappeared, including Interior Minister Zakharchenko, who was reported to have fled to Belarus. 

That day, parliament held an emergency session. The Chairman of parliament, Volodymyr Rybak, resigned that morning, citing illness. Parliament then elected Oleksandr Turchynov as Chairman. Under the 2004 Constitution, which parliament had voted to reinstate, the president's powers would transfer to the Chairman if the president should resign or be unable to fulfill his duties. The former constitution had stated the president's powers would transfer to the Prime Minister. The acting Prime Minister, Serhiy Arbuzov, was also missing.

In the afternoon, the Rada voted 328–0 (about 73% of the parliament's 450 members) to remove Yanukovych from his post and to schedule an early presidential election for 25 May. The resolution stated that Yanukovych had withdrawn from fulfilling his constitutional duties, "which threatens the governance of the state, the territorial integrity and sovereignty of Ukraine", and cited "circumstances of extreme urgency". The resolution to remove Yanukovych was supported by all opposition parties: 86 deputies of Batkivshchyna (Fatherland Party), 41 deputies of the Ukrainian Democratic Alliance for Reform (UDAR), 36 deputies of Svoboda (Freedom Party), 30 deputies of the Communist Party, as well as 99 independents. Furthermore, 36 deputies of Yanukovych's Party of Regions voted for his removal. There were no votes against. Of the remaining deputies, 115 were absent and 6 did not vote. Parliament did not vote to impeach the president, which would have involved formally charging Yanukovych with a crime, a review of the charge by the Constitutional Court of Ukraine, and a three-fourths majority vote in parliament—at least 338 votes in favor. 

Under the 2004 constitution, parliament Chairman Turchynov became acting president. Turchynov claimed that Yanukovych had agreed to resign as president and had recorded a resignation statement, but had changed his mind after consulting with advisers. Yanukovych said he would not resign or leave the country and called parliament's decisions "illegal". He added, "The events witnessed by our country and the whole world are an example of a coup d'état", and compared them to the rise of the Nazi Party in 1930s Germany.

Disappearance and prosecution
Following the parliamentary procedures to transfer power to the new provisional government, General Prosecutor Pshonka and Minister of Revenues and Duties Oleksandr Klymenko were stopped at the Russian border while trying to flee the country. According to the State Border Service, Yanukovych also tried to flee via a charter flight from Donetsk, but was stopped by border guards. The guards were "met by a group of armed men who offered money for flying without the proper clearance". Yanukovych then left by armored car, and his subsequent whereabouts were unknown. Former Interior Minister Zakharchenko also tried to fly out of Donetsk and was similarly turned back.

On 23 February, parliament deputy Oleh Lyashko claimed that Yanukovych had been seen at the Russian naval base in Sevastopol, preparing to flee the country on board a Russian military vessel. Journalist Tetyana Chornovol speculated that he was actually trying to flee on his private yacht, also in Sevastopol. According to court testimony of a bodyguard, Yanukovych and his family flew from Kharkiv to Donetsk by helicopter, then drove to Berdiansk on the Azov Sea, from where they were flown by aircraft with Russian military markings, via two other airfields, to a Russian facility in Yalta, Crimea, then moved to Russian base in Sevastopol, and departed late on 23 February.

On 24 February, acting Interior Minister Avakov announced that Yanukovych had been placed on the country's most wanted list and that "a criminal case on mass killings of civilians has been opened" for him and other officials.

On 25 February, parliament asked the International Criminal Court to "establish and bring to justice" senior Ukrainian officials, including Yanukovych, for crimes against humanity committed during "peaceful protests of citizens" from 21 November 2013 to 22 February 2014. On the same day, Yanukovych and Zakharchenko were declared internationally wanted. Criminal proceedings were launched in 20 February killings of Euromaidan demonstrators. Yanukovych; the former head of the presidential administration, Andriy Kliuyev; former Prosecutor General Pshonka; former Interior Minister Zakharchenko; former SBU head Yakymenko; the commander of the Interior Troops, Stanislav Shuliak; and a number of others were declared suspects in the case.

Aftermath and new government

On 22 February 2014, Yulia Tymoshenko was released from prison and addressed more than 100,000 people on Independence Square. The same day, parliament appointed Arsen Avakov as acting interior minister. Lawmakers also ousted Viktor Pshonka as general prosecutor of Ukraine in a no-confidence vote.

On 23 February, the second day of national mourning, parliament voted to abolish the law on language policies that had given the Russian, Romanian, and Hungarian languages the official status of regional languages in some areas. However, this measure was later vetoed by the acting president, who said he would not sign the bill until new legislation protecting minority languages was developed. The same day, parliament dismissed Foreign Minister Leonid Kozhara, Health Minister Raisa Bogatyrova, and Education Minister Dmytro Tabachnyk and nationalised Yanukovych's private estate Mezhyhirya. Warrants were issued for former Incomes Minister Oleksandr Klymenko and former Prosecutor General Pshonka. Parliament also passed amendments restoring its power to appoint and dismiss judges, which had belonged to the Supreme Council of Justice.

Kyiv Metro became fully operational again, including the reopening of the Maidan Nezalezhnosti station, on 24 February.

On 24 February, parliament dismissed Social Policies Minister Natalia Korolevska and Culture Minister Leonid Novokhatko; it also dismissed Ihor Sorkin as governor of the National Bank of Ukraine and replaced him with Stepan Kubiv. The same day, it appointed Valentyn Nalyvaichenko as head of the Security Service of Ukraine after dismissing Oleksandr Yakymenko from the post. Meanwhile, the leader of the Party of Regions faction, Oleksandr Yefremov, declared that the party was moving into the opposition. Seventy-seven of its MPs had left the faction over the past few days.

On Tuesday, 25 February, acting President Turchynov called for the formation of a national unity government by Thursday. (Two days earlier, he had asked for the formation of such a government by Tuesday.) Also on the 25th, Anatoliy Kinakh and 32 other deputies, mostly former Party of Regions members, created the Economic Development faction.

On 26 February, Turchynov assumed the duties of the supreme commander-in-chief of the Ukrainian Armed Forces.

On 27 February 2014 the first Yatsenyuk government headed by Arseniy Yatsenyuk was formed. The cabinet was formed as a coalition of the parties Batkivschyna, UDAR and Svoboda and the parliamentary factions Economic Development and Sovereign European Ukraine and other independent MPs.

Juridical developments
On 24 February, parliament decided to release all political prisoners, including the father and son in the Pavlichenko criminal case, and terminated the powers of five judges of the Constitutional Court of Ukraine, appointed from parliament's quota, for violating their oath. Lawmakers also offered to dismiss, for the same reason, two judges appointed by the president of Ukraine, and called on the Council of Judges of Ukraine to convene an extraordinary congress within three days to consider dismissing five Constitutional Court judges appointed by the council. In the same resolution, parliament assigned the prosecutor general of Ukraine to begin criminal proceedings against all judges who, in the opinion of the People's Deputies of Ukraine, were guilty of adopting on 30 September 2010 a decision of the Constitutional Court of Ukraine (No. 20-rp/2010) on the procedure of introducing constitutional amendments. On 27 February, judges of the Constitutional Court sent a letter to European organizations, international organizations, and human rights institutions questioning the constitutionality of the parliamentary resolution.

On 27 February, Yanukovych was accused of having stolen $70 billion from the state budget.

The Security Service of Ukraine arrested the former chief of its counterintelligence service, Volodymyr Byk. On 3 July 2014, former Prime Minister Mykola Azarov was placed on the international wanted list for alleged abuse of power.

Yanukovych press conference and Russian response

On 28 February, Yanukovych attended a press conference in southern Russia and answered questions from mostly Russian reporters. He said that the early presidential elections scheduled for late May were illegal and that he "would not be participating in them". He also said that while 21 February agreement could have calmed the situation, the opposition had not agreed to it.

Russia considered the overthrow of Yanukovych to be an illegal coup (and a "military seizure of power") and did not recognize the interim government.

On 1 March, Russia's parliament approved a request from President Vladimir Putin to deploy Russian troops to Ukraine.

On 24 March 2014 Putin stated, referring to the 2014 Ukrainian presidential election, "We will respect the choice of the Ukrainian people and will be working with the authorities formed on the basis of this election."

Ban on Russian state TV
On 11 March 2014 the  instructed all cable operators to stop transmitting a number of Russian channels, including the international versions of the main state-controlled stations—Rossiya 1, Channel One, and NTV—as well as Rossiya 24.

Lustration

On 26 February, Ehor Sobolev was nominated to lead the Committee on Lustration in the new Yatsenyuk government. Months later, on 14 August 2014, parliament adopted a bill that established "procedures for conducting checks of government officials and people nominated for government position with the purpose of deciding whether they meet certain criteria for occupying relevant post".

The law on lustration, which excluded from government most officials who had worked in the Yanukovych administration, affected up to a million people. Volodymyr Yavorsky of the Kharkiv Human Rights Protection Group called it "unreasonable" and a "serious, systematic violations of human rights"—among other reasons, because it meant too many people would lose their jobs, including officials who could not be easily replaced.

Berkut dissolved
On 25 February, acting Interior Minister Avakov signed a decree dissolving the Berkut. In March, Russia announced that the Crimean Berkut unit would preserve its name as it was incorporated into the Russian Interior Ministry.

Protests against the new government
According to Cathy Young, in the Antimaidan protests against the revolution, street posters, Internet posts, and even speeches at rallies attacked the new government as a "Jewish clique" seeking to use Ukrainians to defend the interests of wealthy Jews, and depicted the revolution as a "Zionist coup."

Southern and Eastern Ukraine

The pro-Russian Ukrainian Front organisation held a meeting on 22 February with representatives from southern and eastern Ukraine. Andriy Kluyev, an organiser of the event, said the group intended to discuss the federalisation of the country into semi-autonomous regions. Following the agreement with the opposition and measures passed by parliament, Yanukovych flew from Kyiv to Kharkiv to attend the Ukrainian Front congress; sources indicated that Berkut forces had gathered in Kharkiv in anticipation of the event. As Yuriy Lutsenko reported, past midnight on 22 February, the SBU opened criminal proceedings against Governor Mikhail Dobkin of Kharkiv and Mayor Hennadiy Kernes for advocating separatism.

At the Congress of the Southern and Eastern regions in Kharkiv on 22 February, the deputies passed a resolution declaring that they were ready to take responsibility for protecting constitutional order in their territory. They stated that the recent events in Kyiv had paralyzed the central government and destabilised the country. They also signed a statement rejecting the authority of parliament. The Interior Ministry reported that Governor Dobkin and Mayor Kernes then fled to Russia.

On 23 February, parliament adopted a bill to repeal the country's law on minority languages. If signed by the president, the bill would have disestablished Russian as a minority language of Ukraine, although regions like Crimea are populated by a Russian-speaking majority. The Christian Science Monitor reported that the bill "only served to infuriate Russian-speaking regions, [who] saw the move as more evidence that the antigovernment protests in Kyiv that toppled Yanukovych's government were intent on pressing for a nationalistic agenda." Acting President Turchynov vetoed the bill on 28 February.

Also on 23 February, clashes erupted in Kharkiv between thousands of equally sized pro- and anti-government rallies, and Mayor Kernes was blocked from entering the City Council building. Pro-Russian protesters stood guard over the statue of Vladimir Lenin in the city center, but the deputy head of the Regional State Administration announced that the city would dismantle the statue regardless on 25 February.

On 24 February, acting Interior Minister Avakov announced that a criminal case had been launched against Yevhen Zhylin, leader of the Kharkiv-based anti-Euromaidan organisation Oplot.

On 1 March, thousands of people in Kharkiv, Donetsk, Simferopol, Odesa, Luhansk, Melitopol, Yevpatoria, Kerch, and Mariupol protested against the new government. Public surveys in April revealed that most people in Ukraine's eastern regions considered all levels of the government illegitimate. Half of respondents believed that President Turchynov was "illegally occupying his post". Roughly half held the same opinion about the central government led by Prime Minister Yatsenyuk. However, nearly 70% agreed that Yanukovych was also not the legal president of the country.

Crimea

Following the Ukrainian revolution, a secession crisis began in the Crimean Peninsula. On 1 March 2014, Yanukovych put into writing his request that President Putin of Russia send military forces "to establish legitimacy, peace, law and order, stability and defending the people of Ukraine". On the same day, Putin requested and received authorization from the Russian parliament to deploy troops to Ukraine in response to the crisis. Russian troops accordingly mobilized throughout Crimea and the southeast of Ukraine. By 2 March, Russian troops had complete control over Crimea.

Destruction of Soviet monuments

The monument to the Russian field marshal Mikhail Kutuzov was demolished in the city of Brody in western Ukraine. The militant group Right Sector was blamed for much of the destruction. In addition, a statue honouring Soviet soldiers was removed from the western Ukrainian city of Stryi.
In early December 2013, unknown activists partially painted in red and black (similar to the flag of the nationalistic Ukrainian Insurgent Army) a statue honouring the workers of the Arsenal factory in Kyiv who died in 1918.
On 28 February, a monument dedicated to Soviet forces who fought in World War II and one dedicated to Soviet soldiers who fought in Afghanistan, both in the city of Dnipropetrovsk, were vandalized and painted with nationalistic slogans.

On its English-language Twitter account, the Russian Foreign Ministry described the targeting of Russian- and Soviet-built monuments as "Russophobic vandalism" and an "outrage", and demanded that it be stopped.

Economic
In May 2014, the International Monetary Fund disbursed US$3.2 billion to stabilise Ukraine. The European Union required Ukraine to secure this aid package from the IMF in order to obtain about 1.6 billion euros pledged under the recently signed Ukraine-EU Association Agreement.

Sports
On 19 February 2014, UEFA announced that it had decided to change the venue of the 2013–14 UEFA Europa League Round of 32 match between Dynamo Kyiv and Valencia from Olympic Stadium in Kyiv to GSP Stadium, in Nicosia, Cyprus, because of the riots in Kyiv.

Dynamo Kyiv and the other clubs competing in the Round of 32 held a minute of silence for the victims in Kyiv before the match, and the athletes played wearing mourning armbands.

On 25 February, subsequent games of the 2013–14 Ukrainian Basketball SuperLeague were postponed. On 26 February, the second part of the 2013–14 Ukrainian Premier League was suspended because of the situation in the country.

On 3 March, a scheduled friendly match between the United States and Ukraine in Kharkiv was moved to Nicosia because of safety concerns regarding potential instability in Kharkiv Oblast.

Three HC Donbass home KHL playoff games were moved from Donetsk's Druzhba Arena to Slovnaft Arena in Bratislava, Slovakia. After playing Game 7 of their first-round series against Dinamo Riga and Games 3 and 4 in the second round against Lev Praha in Bratislava, the Slovak capital, the team returned to Donetsk for the sixth game of the series against Lev.

Public opinion
A December 2016 survey by the Kyiv International Institute of Sociology found that 34 percent of respondents in the government-controlled Ukraine regarded the change in power as an "illegal armed coup", while 56 percent regarded it as a "popular revolution".

Signing of the European Union–Ukraine Association Agreement

The First Yatsenyuk Government signed on 21 March 2014 the European Union–Ukraine Association Agreement with the DCFTA to be signed after the presidential election in May 2014.

Suicides of former officials
After Euromaidan, eight former officials tied to Yanukovych's Party of Regions were found to have committed suicide. When Newsweek in summer 2015 approached the General Prosecutor's Office about the deaths, the office initially replied that all information about them was a state secret. The prosecutor's office later said that four of the deaths were being investigated as murders; a suspect was also charged with murder in a fifth case, the death of prosecutor Sergei Melnychuk.

Casualties

After the first day of clashes, 26 people were reported dead: 16 protesters and 10 police officers. Those hospitalised included three minors, five journalists, and 79 police officers. According to Olga Bogomolets, an honored doctor of Ukraine, "snipers were aiming at heart, lungs and neck".

Deaths
From 18 to 19 February, the official death toll according to the Ministry of Healthcare was 28, of whom 10 were police and Berkut troops.

By 13:00 on 20 February, at least 34 more protesters had been fatally shot by the police, with reporters verifying the bodies (15 at the Kozatsky Hotel, 12 at the Hotel Ukraine, 7 at the Central Post Office). In the early afternoon, Kyiv Post journalists reported a further eight bodies on Khreshchatyk Street. According to the coordinator of medical services on Independence Square, Oleh Musiy, between 70 and 100 protesters had been killed by 17:30 on 20 February. Meanwhile, the Kyiv City State Administration reported 67 deaths based on the number of bodies delivered to forensics. The Ministry of Healthcare reported 75 deaths since the start of the conflict.

Speculation on snipers
CNN reported that officials had intercepted a telephone call between Foreign Minister Urmas Paet of Estonia and High Representative of the Union for Foreign Affairs and Security Policy Catherine Ashton in which Paet relayed a doctor's testimony that the sniper killings of protesters and Berkut troops had been committed by the same people. Paet later asserted that he had not been implying that the opposition was involved, but merely relaying the content of the doctor's testimony. Olga Bogomolets, the doctor who allegedly claimed that protesters and Berkut troops had come under fire from the same source, said that she had not made such a claim to Mr. Paet; that she had not implied that the opposition was involved in the killings; and that the government had informed her that an investigation was underway.

Hennadiy Moskal—a former deputy head of Ukraine's main security agency, the SBU, and of the Ministry of Internal Affairs (MIA)—suggested in an interview published in the Ukrainian newspaper Dzerkalo Tizhnya that snipers from the MIA and SBU, not foreign agents, were responsible for the shootings and had acted on contingency plans dating back to Soviet times. He said: "In addition to this, snipers received orders to shoot not only protesters, but also police forces. This was all done in order to escalate the conflict, in order to justify the police operation to clear Maidan."

He further suggested that the current minister of internal affairs, Avakov, and the chairman of the SBU, Nalivaichenko, were protecting the personnel who actually planned and carried out the killings, in order to prevent backlash against the ministry and to avoid a loss of prestige. Avakov said that the conflict had been provoked by a "non-Ukrainian" third party and that an investigation was ongoing.

On 31 March 2014, The Daily Beast published photos and videos showing that the snipers were members of the SBU's "anti-terrorist" Alpha unit who had been trained in Russia. The media suggested that it was not the Ukrainian riot police who fired on the protesters, as previously believed, although the members of the Alpha team are Ukrainian citizens.

Ukrainian mass medias reported the results of forensic examinations, according to which, the government police Berkut was implicated in the murders of maidan protesters since, according to these forensic examinations, matches were found between the bullets extracted from the bodies of maidan protesters and the weapons of the government police Berkut. The experts explained why no match between the bullets and the weapons, which had been assigned to the Berkut special force, had been found as a result of the examination of the bullets held in January 2015, whereas the examination carried out in December of the same year had showed such a match.

Foreign involvement

Russian involvement

The perception that Yanukovych was trying to establish closer ties with Russia played a major role in the protests. Yanukovych accepted "bail-out" money—$2 billion out of a $15 billion package—from Russia, and this was interpreted as a sign that he would seek close ties with Putin. Russian officials had been pressuring the Ukrainian administration to take decisive action to crush the protests, and the police assault on Euromaidan protesters was ordered hours after the $2 billion from Russia was transferred. Several government ministers from across Europe blamed Russia for exacerbating the violence.

In an interview on 20 February, a retired colonel of the Main Intelligence Directorate of Russia (GRU), Aleksandr Musienko, said that the conflict could only be solved by force, and that Ukraine had proven it could not exist as an independent, sovereign state. According to government documents released by Ukrainian former Deputy Interior Minister Hennadiy Moskal, Russian officials served as advisers to the operations against protesters. Code-named "Wave" and "Boomerang", the operations involved the use of snipers to disperse crowds and capture the protesters' headquarters in the House of Trade Unions. Before some police officers defected, the plans included the deployment of 22,000 combined security troops in Kyiv. According to the documents, the former first deputy of the Russian GRU stayed at the Kyiv Hotel, played a major role in the preparations, and was paid by the Security Services of Ukraine. According to Reuters, the authenticity of the documents could not be confirmed. Interior Minister Arsen Avakov said that the conflict had been provoked by a "non-Ukrainian" third party and that an investigation was ongoing.

On 21 February, after a failed crackdown that killed as many as 100 people, Yanukovych made some concessions. In response, Prime Minister Dmitry Medvedev of Russia said that Yanukovych needed to stop behaving like a "doormat", and that further loan installments would be withheld. A Russian political adviser, Sergey Markov, said, "Russia will do everything allowable by law to stop [the opposition] from coming to power." On 24 February, Russia's Foreign Ministry issued a statement urging Ukrainians to "crack down on the extremists who are trying to get established in power", and Medvedev refused to recognise Ukraine's provisional government as legitimate.

During a press conference on 3 April 2014, Ukraine's new interior minister, chief prosecutor, and top security chief implicated more than 30 Russian Federal Security Service (FSB) agents in the crackdown on protesters, saying that, in addition to taking part in the planning, the agents had flown shipments of large quantities of explosives into an airport near Kyiv. Valentyn Nalyvaichenko, the interim head of the Security Service of Ukraine (SBU), said the agents had been stationed in Kyiv throughout the Euromaidan protests, had been provided with "state telecommunications" while residing at an SBU compound, and had kept in regular contact with Ukrainian security officials. "We have substantiated grounds to consider that these very groups which were located at an SBU training ground took part in the planning and execution of activities of this so-called antiterrorist operation," Nalyvaichenko said. Investigators, he added, had established that Yanukovych's SBU chief, Oleksandr Yakymenko, who later fled the country, had received reports from FSB agents stationed in Ukraine, and that Yakymenko had held several briefings with the agents. The FSB rejected these claims as "groundless accusations" and otherwise refused to comment.

United States involvement
In December 2013, Republican Senator John McCain in company with Democratic senator Chris Murphy visited Yatsenyuk and Tyahnybok and later addressed the crowds:

Ukraine will make Europe better and Europe will make Ukraine better, we are here to support your just cause, the sovereign right of Ukraine to determine its own destiny freely and independently. And the destiny you seek lies in Europe.

Speaking to CNN on the same day, McCain said:

What we're trying to do is try to bring about a peaceful transition here, that would stop the violence and give the Ukrainian people what they unfortunately have not had, with different revolutions that have taken place – a real society. This is a grassroots revolution here – it's been peaceful except when the government tried to crack down on them, and the government hasn't tried that since. I'm praising their ability and their desire to demonstrate peacefully for change that I think they deserve. [...] These people love the United States of America, they love freedom – and I don't think you could view this as anything other than our traditional support for people who want free and democratic society.

In a recorded phone conversation leaked on 4 February, 2014, Assistant Secretary of State Victoria Nuland and US Ambassador to Ukraine Geoffrey Pyatt are heard discussing their wishes for a Ukraine transition to an interim government, and specifically, the roles in which they hoped to see the prominent opposition leaders:
Nuland: "I don't think Klitsch (Klitschko) should go into the government. I don't think it's necessary, I don't think it's a good idea."

Pyatt: "Just let him stay out and do his political homework and stuff."

Nuland: "I think Yats (Yatsenyuk) is the guy who's got the economic experience the governing experience. I just think Klitsch going in… he's going to be at that level working for Yatseniuk, it's just not going to work. We want to try to get somebody with an international personality to come out here and help to midwife this thing."Nuland was also recorded in the same conversation saying, "Fuck the EU," dismissively referring to slow-moving European efforts to address political paralysis and a looming fiscal crisis in Ukraine.

See also 
 Colour revolution
 Falling (2017 film)

Notes

References

Euromaidan
 
Protests in Ukraine
Revolutions in Ukraine
Riots and civil disorder in Ukraine
2014 in Ukraine
Conflicts in 2014
21st-century revolutions
Anti-communism in Ukraine
History of Ukraine since 1991
Massacres in Ukraine
Modern history of Ukraine
Political history of Ukraine
Ukrainian democracy movements
Ukrainian nationalism
Russia–Ukraine relations
Ukraine–European Union relations
Wars involving Russia
Wars involving Ukraine
Articles containing video clips
2010s in Kyiv
February 2014 events in Europe